Des Lacs may refer to:

 Des Lacs, North Dakota
 Des Lacs National Wildlife Refuge Complex
 Des Lacs National Wildlife Refuge
 Des Lacs River